The FitzHugh–Nagumo model (FHN), named after Richard FitzHugh (1922–2007) who suggested the system in 1961 and J. Nagumo et al. who created the equivalent circuit the following year, describes a prototype of an excitable system (e.g., a neuron).

The FHN Model is an example of a relaxation oscillator because, if the external stimulus  exceeds a certain threshold value, the system will exhibit a characteristic excursion in phase space, before the variables  and  relax back to their rest values.

This behaviour is typical for spike generations (a short, nonlinear elevation of membrane voltage , diminished over time by a slower, linear recovery variable ) in a neuron after stimulation by an external input current.

The equations for this dynamical system read

 

 

The dynamics of this system can be nicely described by zapping between the left and right branch of the cubic nullcline.

The FitzHugh–Nagumo model is a simplified 2D version of the Hodgkin–Huxley model which models in a detailed manner activation and deactivation dynamics of a spiking neuron. The equivalent circuit was suggested by Jin-ichi Nagumo, Suguru Arimoto, and Shuji Yoshizawa.

See also

Autowave
Biological neuron model
Computational neuroscience
Hodgkin–Huxley model
Morris–Lecar model
Reaction–diffusion
Theta model

References

Further reading

FitzHugh R. (1955) "Mathematical models of threshold phenomena in the nerve membrane". Bull. Math. Biophysics, 17:257—278
FitzHugh R. (1961) "Impulses and physiological states in theoretical models of nerve membrane". Biophysical J. 1:445–466
FitzHugh R. (1969) "Mathematical models of excitation and propagation in nerve". Chapter 1 (pp. 1–85 in H. P. Schwan, ed. Biological Engineering, McGraw–Hill Book Co., N.Y.)
Nagumo J., Arimoto S., and Yoshizawa S. (1962) "An active pulse transmission line simulating nerve axon". Proc. IRE. 50:2061–2070.

External links
FitzHugh–Nagumo model on Scholarpedia
Interactive FitzHugh-Nagumo. Java applet, includes phase space and parameters can be changed at any time.
Interactive FitzHugh–Nagumo in 1D.  Java applet to simulate 1D waves propagating in a ring. Parameters can also be changed at any time.
Interactive FitzHugh–Nagumo in 2D. Java applet to simulate 2D waves including spiral waves. Parameters can also be changed at any time.
Java applet for two coupled FHN systems Options include time delayed coupling, self-feedback, noise induced excursions, data export to file. Source code available (BY-NC-SA license).

Nonlinear systems
Electrophysiology
Computational neuroscience
Biophysics